Say Wonderful Things was a 1963 LP album by Patti Page, released by Columbia Records as catalog numbers CL 2049 (monaural) and CS 8849 (stereo). The album was Page's first LP for Columbia after her long and successful tenure on Mercury Records. The title song only reached #81 on the Billboard Hot 100, but was more successful in international markets such as Australia, Hong Kong and Japan. The album reached a peak of #83 on the Billboard Pop Albums chart.

It was re-released in compact disc form, combined with Patti Page's 1964 album, Love After Midnight, by Collectables Records, on November 25, 2003.

Track listing

Patti Page albums
1963 albums
Columbia Records albums